Kalbeeba is a locality east of Gawler in South Australia. It is named for a former railway station on the Barossa Valley railway line. The northern boundary of Kalbeeba is now the Barossa Valley Way, and its southwestern boundary is the South Para River.

The Concordia brigade of the Country Fire Service is based in the northeastern corner of Kalbeeba. The western end of the Barossa Trail, a shared walking and cycling track, is adjacent to the railway line in Kalbeeba.

References